Todd Woodbridge and Mark Woodforde were the defending champions but lost in the final 6–4, 1–6, 6–3 against Patrick Rafter and Bryan Shelton.

Seeds

  Todd Woodbridge /  Mark Woodforde (final)
  Byron Black /  Grant Connell (semifinals)
  Yevgeny Kafelnikov /  Daniel Vacek (first round)
  Ellis Ferreira /  Patrick Galbraith (first round)

Draw

References
 1997 Australian Men's Hardcourt Championships Doubles Draw

Next Generation Adelaide International
1997 ATP Tour
1997 in Australian tennis